Friedrich Wilhelm Kritzinger (24 January 181612 July 1890) was a German Protestant theologian, pedagogue, poet and hymnwriter. He was for 38 years the director of a newly founded educational institution for women teachers in Droyßig. His Christmas carol "Süßer die Glocken nie klingen", written to the melody of a popular Volkslied, has remained a favourite.

Life 
He studied theology in Berlin with August Neander. He directed a private educational institution in Pyritz, Pomerania, from 1847 to 1850. He was then appointed Rektor of the municipal school (Stadtschule) in Naugard. Kritzinger held the position for 38 years.

He wrote poems and hymns, to be used first of all in the daily morning devotions (Morgenandacht) that he held, and further for high religious holidays. His Christmas carol Süßer die Glocken nie klingen, which he wrote to the melody of a popular Volkslied from Thuringia, "Dort sinket die Sonne im Westen", achieved lasting popularity.

Due to ill health, he requested retirement for 1 July 1890. He moved with his family to Naumburg where he died shortly afterwards. He was buried on the cemetery of Droyßig opposite the graves of the Prince's family, as  requested.

Awards 
Kritzinger was awarded the knighthood of the House Order of Hohenzollern in 1875. He received the title Königlicher Schulrat (Royal school counselor) in 1885. He was awarded the Order of the Red Eagle class IV in 1888, and class III in 1890. The Wilhelm-Kritzinger-Straße in Droyßig is named after him. In his birth town, a street is named Kritzinger-Gasse in honour of him and his brother Ludwig Kritzinger.

Work 
Kritzinger's published works include, according to contemporary lists:
 Lebensblüthen in Liedern. Duncker, Berlin 1857.
 Liederbüchlein für Kinder. Streiber, Zeitz 1857.
 Eichenblätter zu Preußens jüngstem Ehrenkranze. Heinicke, Berlin 1864, .
 Samenkörner aus Gottes Wort. Kay, Kassel 1866, .
 Weihnachtsbüchlein für Schule und Haus. Webel, Zeitz 1866, .
 Weihnachtsstrauß für Haus und Schule. Huch, Zeitz 1869.
 Vaterlands-Lieder. Huch, Zeitz 1876.
 Pilgerklänge. Gedichte. Huch, Zeitz 1885, .

"" 

Kritzinger is remembered for the lyrics of one song, the Christmas carol "" (Sweeter the bells never sound). He wrote it to go with a popular Volkslied melody, of the evening song "Seht, wie die Sonne dort sinket" (Look how the sun is setting there), which was documented from 1841. Kritzinger's song was first printed in 1860 in the collection Liederstrauß (Song bouquet) by Bernhard Brähmig. The earlier song mentions bells, which may have inspired Kritzinger to write about bells ringing throughout the world as a symbol of peace and joy.

References

Further reading 
 Gedenkblätter des Königlichen Lehrerinnen-Seminars zu Droyßig, 6 volumes, 1857 to 1890
 Paul Meyer (ed.): Festschrift zum 50-jährigen Bestehen der Droyßiger Anstalten am 1. Oktober 1902, Breslau 1902
 Droyßiger Blätter. numbers 1 to 12 (1927 to 1932)
 Hermann Petrich: Unser Geistliches Volkslied. 2nd ed. 1924, p. 185–196
 Monatshefte für Evangelische Kirchengemeinden des Rheinlandes, 34th year, 1985, pp. 269
 Harry Beyer: Kritzinger, Friedrich Wilhelm. In: Biographisch-Bibliographisches Kirchenlexikon (BBKL). vol. 4, Bautz, Herzberg 1992, col. 668–670.

External links 

 
 

19th-century German Protestant theologians
19th-century German educators
German Protestant hymnwriters
People from Brandenburg an der Havel
People from Burgenlandkreis
1816 births
1890 deaths